Robert Gerald Hendren (August 10, 1923 – March 5, 1999) was an American football offensive tackle in the National Football League for the Washington Redskins.  He played college football at the University of Southern California and was drafted in the ninth round (59th overall) of the 1946 NFL Draft.

Early years
Hendren attended Clarinda High School. He enrolled at Culver-Stockton College, before transferring to the University of Southern California. He was one of the stars of the 1948 East-West Shrine Game in San Francisco.

Professional career
Hendren was selected by the Washington Redskins in the seventhth round (59th overall) of the 1946 NFL Draft. He played 3 seasons in the NFL.

Note
His 1949 Leaf football card has a misspelled last name, shown as Hendreen.

1923 births
1999 deaths
American football offensive tackles
People from Nodaway County, Missouri
Players of American football from Missouri
Culver–Stockton Wildcats football players
USC Trojans football players
Washington Redskins players